The 2003 Oyo State gubernatorial election occurred on April 19, 2003. PDP's Rashidi Ladoja won election for a first tenure, defeating Incumbent Governor, AD's Lam Adesina and three other candidates.

Rashidi Ladoja emerged winner in the PDP gubernatorial primary election. His running mate was Adebayo Alao-Akala.

Electoral system
The Governor of Oyo State is elected using the plurality voting system.

Results
A total of five candidates registered with the Independent National Electoral Commission to contest in the election. PDP candidate Rashidi Ladoja won election for a first tenure, defeating AD Incumbent Governor, Lam Adesina, and three other candidates.

The total number of registered voters in the state was 2,209,953. However, only 51.4% (i.e. 1,130,142) of registered voters participated in the excerise.

References 

Oyo State gubernatorial elections
Gubernatorial election 2003
Oyo State gubernatorial election